The 2019 Polish Indoor Athletics Championships was the 63rd edition of the national championship in indoor track and field for Poland. It was held on 16–17 February at Arena Toruń in Toruń. A total of 31 events (divided evenly between the sexes, with one mixed-sex event) were contested over the two-day competition. It served as the selection meeting for Poland at the 2019 European Athletics Indoor Championships.

Results

Men

Women

Mixed

References

Results
 63. PZLA Halowe Mistrzostwa Polski. Toruń, 16–17 lutego 2019 . Polish Athletics Federation (2017-02-21). Retrieved 2019-07-14.

Polish Indoor Athletics Championships
Polish Indoor Athletics Championships
Polish Indoor Athletics Championships
Polish Indoor Athletics Championships
Sport in Toruń